Heart & Soul is the seventh studio album released by American country music singer-songwriter Eric Church. The album was split into three separate albums: Heart (released on April 16, 2021), & (released exclusively as a vinyl record to members of his fan club, called the Church Choir, on April 20, 2021, then released as digital on August 19, 2022) and Soul (released on April 23, 2021). The album was released by EMI Nashville, who have been Church's label home since 2011's Chief. It was preceded by the singles "Stick That in Your Country Song", which received a nomination for Best Country Solo Performance at the 63rd Annual Grammy Awards, and "Hell of a View".

Background
In a short video to fans on January 21, 2021, Church officially announced the triple-album which would be released in April. He revealed that he wrote and recorded the majority of the songs for the project during a 28 day trip to the mountains of North Carolina in the midst of the COVID-19 pandemic. In an official statement, Church explained: "I've always been intrigued when a song is born in a writer room -- there is a magic that happens there. I wanted to put that in the studio form. So, every day, we would write a song in the morning and we would record the song that night. Doing it that way allowed for the songwriters to get involved in the studio process and the musicians to be involved in the creative process. You felt a little bit like you were secretly doing something that was special, and you knew it [...] You started going, 'Hmm, wait 'til the world finds out about this."

Of creating a triple album, Church stated that "The interesting thing about this process is that Jay kept asking me the last three or four days, 'Are we done?' And at that time I didn't know what the project was. I kept saying 'God, this is going to be really hard. There's a lot here. Is this a double album? And if it's a double album, how do we leave out these five or six songs?' I am the hardest critic on making sure every song deserves to be on the record, and I beat this thing to death going, 'This can't be that good.' But, it was just a special, special time and a special, special project that I think will be among our best."

The second of the three releases, & was available as a vinyl exclusive to members of Church's official fan group, the Church Choir. & was released to CD and digital/streaming platforms on August 19, 2022.

Track listing
Adapted from Rolling Stone Country.

Personnel
Credits adapted from Taste of Country.

Casey Beathard – acoustic guitar, background vocals, handclaps
Jim "Moose" Brown – piano, organ
Jeff Cease – acoustic guitar, electric guitar, slide guitar, handclaps
Eric Church – acoustic guitar, electric guitar, lead vocals, handclaps
Joanna Cotten – background vocals, handclaps
Luke Dick – acoustic guitar, electric guitar, steel guitar, handclaps
Jason Hall – background vocals, handclaps
Jaxon Hargrove – handclaps
Lee Hendricks – bass guitar, handclaps
Jeff Hyde – acoustic guitar, banjo, mandolin, background vocals, handclaps
Jay Joyce – acoustic guitar, electric guitar, keyboards, organ, programming, synthesizer, tambourine, background vocals, handclaps
Billy Justineau – piano, mellotron, organ, synthesizer, synth bass, handclaps
Jimmy Mansfield – handclaps
Rob McNelley – electric guitar
John Peets – handclaps
Jonathan Singleton – background vocals
Brian Snoddy – handclaps
Bryan Sutton – acoustic guitar, dobro, mandolin, resonator guitar
Jeffrey Steele – acoustic guitar, background vocals
Kenny Vaughan – acoustic guitar, electric guitar
Driver Williams – electric guitar, handclaps
Charlie Worsham – acoustic guitar, banjo, electric guitar, mandolin, handclaps
Craig Wright – drums, percussion, background vocals, handclaps

Charts

Weekly charts

Heart

&

Soul

Year-end charts

Heart

Soul

References

2021 albums
Albums produced by Jay Joyce
EMI Records albums
Eric Church albums